GoNetSpeed, originally founded as OTELCO, Inc. is a telecommunications holding company based in Oneonta, Alabama. The company owns small, independent telephone companies in West Virginia, Missouri, Maine, Massachusetts, Vermont, and Alabama. Its services include local and long distance telephone, network access, cable television and other related services. The company was publicly traded on NASDAQ until 2021 when it was acquired by private equity firm Oak Hill Capital Partners for $40.6 million.

The company owns:
Brindlee Mountain Telephone Company - Arab, Alabama
Granby Telephone & Telegraph - Granby, Massachusetts
Mid-Maine Communications - Bangor, Maine
Mid-Missouri Telephone - Pilot Grove, Missouri
Pine Tree Telephone & Telegraph - Gray and New Gloucester, Maine
Saco River Telephone & Telegraph - Waterboro, West Buxton, and Bar Mills, Maine
Shoreham Telephone Company - Shoreham, Vermont
War Telephone - McDowell County, West Virginia
Oneonta Telephone Company - Oneonta, Alabama

The company's subsidiaries do business as OTELCO.

As of April 27, 2022, the company rebranded as GoNetSpeed to represent their focus on providing fiber internet.

References

External links
Otelco, Inc.

 
Telecommunications companies established in 1998
Companies based in Alabama
Companies formerly listed on the Nasdaq